Ardalan was a vassaldom in Persia.

Ardalan may also refer to:

Places
 Ardalan, East Azerbaijan
 Ardalan, Qazvin
 Ardalan, Razavi Khorasan
 Ardalan Rural District, in East Azerbaijan Province

Persons

Given name
Ardalan Afshar (born 1984), Austrian rapper of Iranian descent better known as Nazar
Ardalan Ashtiani (born 1982), Iranian football player
Ardalan Shekarabi (born 1978), Swedish politician Iranian origin
Ardalan Shoja Kaveh (born 1963), Iranian actor

Surname
Aligholi Ardalan (1900–1986), Iranian diplomat
Davar Ardalan, American-Iranian radio producer
Farhad Ardalan (born 1939), Iranian physicist
Mastoureh Ardalan (1805 –1848), Kurdish poet and writer
Niloufar Ardalan (born 1985), Iranian football player 
Parvin Ardalan (born 1967), Iranian women's rights activist, writer and journalist